Ishan Kumar Patro is an Indian academic and former vice-chancellor of Ravenshaw University, Odisha, India.

Education 
Patro pursued his M.Phil. and Ph.D. from Kurukshetra University. Haryana. He did his post-doctoral research from University of Cologne, Germany.

Career 
Patro has a teaching experience of almost 3 decades. In 2017 Patro was appointed as the vice-chancellor of Ravenshaw University, India for a period of 3 years. He succeeded Prakash Chandra Sarangi in this position. Before joining as a vice-chancellor, Patro was working as a professor in Neuroscience/Zoology department of Jiwaji University, Gwalior. Madhya Pradesh.
Currently, he also serves as the president of Indian Academy of Neurosciences.

References 

Living people
Kurukshetra University alumni
Odisha academics
University of Cologne alumni
Year of birth missing (living people)